Webberton is an industrial suburb northeast of Geraldton, Western Australia. Its local government area is the City of Greater Geraldton.

The suburb was gazetted in 1972.

Geography
It is bounded by North West Coastal Highway to the west, Place Road to the south, Fallowfield Street to the east and Bedford and Koojarra Streets to the north.

References

Suburbs of Geraldton